John C. Cambier is an American immunologist and microbiologist, currently a Distinguished Professor at Anschutz Medical Campus, and also a published author.

References

Year of birth missing (living people)
Living people
University of Denver faculty
American microbiologists
University of Iowa alumni
Duke University faculty